Hilal Ben Moussa (born 22 May 1992) is  a Dutch-Moroccan footballer who plays as a midfielder for DVS '33. He formerly played in the Netherlands and Romania for FC Groningen, FC Volendam, FC Emmen and Sepsi OSK Sfântu Gheorghe.

Club career
Ben Moussa was promoted to the senior team of FC Groningen in 2011. He did not make any appearance in that season. He made his debut for The Green-White Army on 2 February 2013 coming as a 90+2 minute substitute for Género Zeefuik against AZ. He joined Volendam on non-professional terms in September 2015.

In January 2023, Ben Moussa signed for Derde Divisie club DVS '33 on a contract until the end of the season.

References

External links
 
 

1992 births
Living people
Footballers from Utrecht (city)
Dutch sportspeople of Moroccan descent
Dutch footballers
Association football midfielders
FC Groningen players
FC Volendam players
DVS '33 players
Eredivisie players
Eerste Divisie players
FC Emmen players